The Laguna Garzón Bridge is a bridge crossing the Laguna Garzón in Uruguay, on the border between the Maldonado and Rocha departments. The bridge is famous for its unusual circular shape and was designed by Uruguayan architect Rafael Viñoly. It is designed in a circular shape to force drivers to slow down, and allows for pedestrian access along the one-way circular route, including crosswalks that allow pedestrian access to either the inner or outer sidewalks of the circle.

Laguna Garzón was previously served by a small 2-vehicle ferry that required daylight and good weather to operate. The bridge replaced the ferry in December 2015, providing a crossing for pedestrians and up to approximately 1,000 vehicles a day.

Construction 
Construction for the Laguna Garzón Bridge began in September 2014 and ended in December 2015. It cost $10 million to build, 80 percent of which was provided by Argentine real estate developer, Eduardo Costantini. To build the bridge, 450 tons of steel, 500 cubic metres of concrete, and 40,000 metres of cables were used.

Gallery

References

External links

 The bridge's page on Rafael Viñoly's website

Road bridges
Bridges in Uruguay
Architecture in Uruguay